Buzdyak (Büzdäk) is a rural locality (a selo) and the administrative center of Buzdyaksky District in Republic of Bashkortostan, Russia.

History 

Buzdyak was originally named Kanlytyuba during its settlement by the Bashkirs of the Kanlinsky volost. The name later changed further to Toruyino, where in 1738 the Bashir-Canlinian Buzdyak Ishembetov lived, by whose name this village is known today.

Before construction of the Inza railway Chishmy line (1910-1912) existed the Misharsky village of Tabanlykul. Initially the railway was supposed to head north through souther Buzdyak (now Old Buzdyak), however, a group of deputies of the state Duma of the third convocation, primarily Gaisa Enikeev, made a change in the project. As a result the branch ran 4 kilometers south from the initial plan, through the dried lake Tabanlykul and further near the clan village of Enikeev Kargaly. The station that arose on the site of Tabanlykul received the name Buzdyak, and the village thus became known as Buzdyak. 

In February 1942, at the Buzdyak railway station, the 1097th, 1098th cannon-artillery, 121st, 122nd, and 123rd mortar regiments were formed.

References

Notes

Sources

Rural localities in Buzdyaksky District